The Chiltern Way is a waymarked long-distance footpath in the Chiltern Hills of southern England. It was created by the Chiltern Society as a Millennium  project.

Route
There are three extensions - the North Chiltern Trail, the Southern Extension and the Berkshire Loop - adding a further  between them.

The route is circular and runs through the Chiltern Hills region, passing through parts of the counties of Bedfordshire, Buckinghamshire, Hertfordshire and Oxfordshire. The route includes the Chilterns Area of Outstanding Natural Beauty and many of the town and villages situated in the Chilterns such as Chalfont St Giles, Marlow, Radnage, and Stokenchurch.

See also
 Chiltern Cycleway

Sources

External links
Chiltern Society - The Chiltern Way
Chilterns AONB website - The Chiltern Way
Route of the Chiltern Way on ViewRanger

Long-distance footpaths in England
Footpaths in Hertfordshire
Chiltern Hills